Anya's Bell is a television film that aired on CBS on October 31, 1999, starring Della Reese as Anya Herpick.

Plot
In 1949, Anya is a blind woman who was always taken care of by her mother.  Anya copes with her loneliness by collecting bells, a situation which becomes worse when her mother dies. Now middle-aged and alone, Anya befriends a 12-year-old delivery boy, Scott Rhymes (Mason Gamble). Scott is considered "slow", though later it is revealed that he is dyslexic (a disorder not commonly understood at that time). Anya teaches him to read Braille, which Scott rapidly learns, and the two become close friends.

Cast
Della Reese as Anya Herpick
Mason Gamble as Scott Rhymes
Kelly Rowan as Jeanne Rhymes
Tom Cavanagh as Patrick Birmingham

Awards
2000 Young Artist Award: Best Performance in a TV Movie or Pilot - Leading Young Actor; Best Family TV Movie or Pilot - Network

Nominated
2000 Humanitas Prize

See also
List of artistic depictions of dyslexia

References

External links

 
Variety review

1999 television films
1999 films
Dyslexia in fiction
1999 drama films
Films set in the 1940s
Films directed by Tom McLoughlin
Films scored by Lee Holdridge
CBS network films
1990s English-language films
Films about disability